Sait Orahovac (24 May 1909 – 21 November 1992) was a Bosnian writer and folklorist.

Orahovac was born in Podgorica, Montenegro in 1909.

References

1909 births
1992 deaths
Writers from Podgorica
Bosniaks of Bosnia and Herzegovina
Bosniaks of Montenegro
Bosnia and Herzegovina Muslims
Yugoslav writers
Bosnia and Herzegovina novelists
20th-century novelists
Bosnia and Herzegovina people of Montenegrin descent